The history of Southern Africa has been divided into its prehistory, its ancient history, the major polities flourishing, the colonial period, and the post-colonial period, in which the current nations were formed. Southern Africa is the southern region of Africa, bordered by Central Africa, East Africa, the Atlantic Ocean, the Indian Ocean, and the Sahara Desert. Colonial boundaries are reflected in the modern boundaries between contemporary Southern African states, cutting across ethnic and cultural lines, often dividing single ethnic groups between two or more states.

Geography

The area located at the south of the desert is a steppe, a semi-arid region, called the Sahel. It is the ecoclimatic and biogeographic zone of transition in Africa between the Sahara desert to the north and the Sudanian Savanna to the south. The Sudanian Savanna is a broad belt of tropical savanna that spans the African continent, from the Atlantic Ocean coast in the West Sudanian savanna to the Ethiopian Highlands in the East Sudanian savanna.

Climate

In 15,000 BP, the West African Monsoon transformed the landscape of Africa and began the Green Sahara period; greater rainfall during the summer season resulted in the growth of humid conditions (e.g., lakes, wetlands) and the savanna (e.g., grassland, shrubland) in North Africa. Between 5500 BP and 4000 BP, the Green Sahara period ended.

Prehistory

By at least 170,000 BP, amid the Middle Stone Age, Southern Africans cooked and ate Hypoxis angustifolia rhizomes at Border Cave, South Africa, which may have provided carbohydrates for their migratory activities.

In 92,000 BP, amid the Middle Stone Age, Malawian foragers utilized fire to influence and alter their surrounding environment.

Between 65,000 BP and 37,000 BP, amid the Middle to Late Stone Age, Southern Africans developed the bow and arrow.

Ancient history

Bantu expansion

From West Africa, Bantu-speaking peoples migrated, along with their ceramics, into other areas of Sub-Saharan Africa. The Kalundu ceramic type may have spread into Southeastern Africa. Additionally, the Eastern African Urewe ceramic type of Lake Victoria may have spread, via African shores near the Indian Ocean, as the Kwale ceramic type, and spread, via Zimbabwe, Zambia, and Malawi, as the Nkope ceramic type.

Though some may have been created later, the earlier red finger-painted rock art may have been created between 6000 BP and 1800 BP, to the south of Kei River and Orange River by Khoisan hunter-gatherer-herders, in Malawi and Zambia by considerably dark-skinned, occasionally bearded, bow-and-arrow-wielding Akafula hunter-gatherers who resided in Malawi until 19th century CE, and in Transvaal by the Vhangona people.

Bantu-speaking farmers, or their Proto-Bantu progenitors, created the later white finger-painted rock art in some areas of Tanzania, Malawi, Angola, Zambia, and Zimbabwe, as well as in the northern regions of Mozambique, Botswana, and Transvaal. The Transvaal (e.g., Soutpansberg, Waterberg) rock art was specifically created by Sotho-speakers (e.g., Birwa, Koni, Tlokwa) and Venda people. Concentric circles, stylized humans, stylized animals, ox-wagons, saurian figures, Depictions of crocodiles and snakes were included in the white finger-painted rock art tradition, both of which were associated with rainmaking and, crocodiles in particular, were also associated with fertility. The white finger-painted rock art may have been created for reasons relating to initiation rites and puberty rituals. Depictions from the rock art tradition of Bantu-speaking farmers have been found on divination-related items (e.g., drums, initiation figurines, initiation masks); fertility terracotta masks from Transvaal have been dated to the 1st millennium CE. Along with Iron Age archaeological sites from the 1st millennium CE, this indicates that white finger-painted rock art tradition may have been spanned from the Early Iron Age to the Later Iron Age.

Post-classical history

Kingdom of Mapungubwe

The largest settlement from what has been dubbed the Leopard's Kopje culture is known as the K2 culture and was the immediate predecessor to the settlement of Mapungubwe. The people of the K2 culture, probably derived from the ancestors of the Shona and Kalanga people of southern Africa, was attracted to the Shashi-Limpopo area, likely because it provided mixed agricultural possibilities. The area was also prime elephant country, providing access to valuable ivory. The control of the gold and ivory trade greatly increased the political power of the K2 culture. By 1075 CE, the population of K2 had outgrown the area and relocated to Mapungubwe Hill.

Kingdom of Zimbabwe

The kingdom taxed other rulers throughout the region. The kingdom was composed of over 150 tributaries headquartered in their own minor zimbabwes.

Kingdom of Mutapa

Mutota's son and successor, Nyanhewe Matope, extended this new kingdom into an empire encompassing most of the lands between Tavara and the Indian Ocean. This empire had achieved uniting a number of different peoples in Southern Africa by building strong, well-trained armies and encouraging states to join voluntarily, offering membership in the Great council of the Empire to any who joined without resistance. Matope's armies overran the kingdom of the Manyika as well as the coastal kingdoms of Kiteve and Madanda. By the time the Portuguese arrived on the coast of Mozambique, the Mutapa Kingdom was the premier state in the region. He raised a strong army which conquered the Dande area of the Tonga and Tavara. The empire had reached its full extent by the year 1480 CE a mere 50 years following its creation.

Kingdom of Butua

Prior to becoming a part of the Rozwi kingdom, the Togwa dynasty ruled the kingdom of Butua until 1683 CE.

Torwa dynasty

At Khami, the Kalanga people, along with people from Great Zimbabwe, founded the Torwa dynasty.

Kingdom of Maravi

Between the 16th century CE and the 19th century CE, the kingdoms of Maravi (e.g., Undi, Lundu, Kalonga) prospered.

Modern history

Merina Kingdom

By the early 19th century CE, the Merina were able to overcome rival tribes such as the Bezanozano, the Betsimisaraka, and eventually the Sakalava kingdom and bring them under the Merina crown. It is through this process that the ethnonym "Merina" began to be commonly used, as it denotes prominence in the Malagasy language. Though some sources describe the Merina expansion as the unification of Madagascar, this period of Merina expansion was seen by neighboring tribes such as the Betsimisaraka as aggressive acts of colonialism. By 1824 CE, the Merina captured the port of Mahajanga situated on the western coast of the island marking a further expansion of power. Under Radama I, the Merina continued to launch military expeditions that both expanded imperial control and enriched military chiefs. The ability of the Merina to overcome neighboring tribes was due to British firepower and military training. The British had an interest in establishing trade with the Merina kingdom due to its central position on the island since 1815 CE. Merina imperial expeditions became more frequent and violent after the renunciation of the second Merina-British treaty. Between 1828 CE and 1840 CE, more than 100,000 men were killed and more than 200,000 enslaved by Merina forces. Imperial rule was met with resistance from escaped slaves and other refugees from imperial rule numbering in the tens of thousands. These refugees formed raiding brigands that were dealt with by imperial troops who hunted them down in 1835 CE. Notably, the rate of escaping refugees only heightened the demand for slave labor in the Merina kingdom, further fueling campaigns of military expansion. Throughout the middle of the 19th century CE, continued imperial expansion and increasing control in coastal trade solidified Merina predominance over the island. The Merina kingdom nearly consolidated all of Madagascar into a single nation before French colonization in 1895 CE.

Rozwi Empire

Records from the Portuguese show that the Rozvi were sophisticated military strategists. They were noted for using the cow-horn formation years before the great Zulu leader Shaka adopted it in the 19th century CE. Armed with spears, shields, bows and arrows, the aggressive Rozvi took over the Zimbabwe plateau.

Ndwandwe Kingdom

The kingdom of Ndwande developed in the 19th century CE due to various kinds of changes (e.g., socioeconomic, political).

Mthethwa Paramountcy

According to Muzi Mthethwa (1995), the Mthethwas are descended from the Nguni tribes of northern Natal and the Lubombo Mountains, whose modern identity dates back some 700 years. They are among the first Nguni-Tsonga groups who left the Great Lakes in Central Africa between 200 CE and 1200 CE. On arrival in Southern Africa, they settled around modern-day Swaziland, mainly on the Lubombo Mountains, before leaving in the 17th century CE to settle in modern-day KwaZulu-Natal, in the Nkandla region. It consisted of roughly 30 Nguni Chiefdoms, lineages, and clans. Unlike its successor, the Zulu Kingdom, the Mthethwa Paramountcy was a confederation. After Zulu prince Sigidi kaSenzagakhona (better known as Shaka Zulu) became king, he forged a nearly homogeneous nation with a single king (nkosi).

The Mthethwa Paramountcy was consolidated and extended under the rule of Dingiswayo. The chief entered into an alliance with the Tsonga to the north in the early 19th century CE and began trading Ivory and other things with the Portuguese in Mozambique.

Zulu Kingdom

Shaka was the illegitimate son of Senzangakhona, King of the Zulus. He was born  1787 CE. He and his mother, Nandi, were exiled by Senzangakhona, and found refuge with the Mthethwa. Shaka fought as a warrior under Jobe, and then under Jobe's successor, Dingiswayo, leader of the Mthethwa Paramountcy. When Senzangakona died, Dingiswayo helped Shaka become chief of the Zulu Kingdom. After Dingiswayo's death at the hands of Zwide, king of the Ndwandwe, around 1818 CE, Shaka assumed leadership of the entire Mthethwa alliance.

Shaka initiated many military, social, cultural and political reforms, forming a well-organized and centralised Zulu state. The most important reforms involved the transformation of the army, through the innovative tactics and weapons, and a showdown with the spiritual leadership, witchdoctors, effectively ensuring the subservience of the "Zulu church" to the state.

The alliance under his leadership survived Zwide's first assault at the Battle of Gqokli Hill in 1818 CE. Within two years, Shaka had defeated Zwide at the Battle of Mhlatuze River in 1820 CE and broken up the Ndwandwe alliance, some of whom in turn began a murderous campaign against other Nguni tribes and clans, setting in motion what became known as Difaqane or Mfecane, a mass-migration of tribes fleeing the remnants of the Ndwandwe fleeing the Zulu. The death toll has never been satisfactorily determined, but the whole region became nearly depopulated. Normal estimates for the death toll during this period range from 1 million to 2 million people. These numbers are however controversial.

Kingdom of Mthwakazi

Mthwakazi is the traditional name of the proto-Ndebele people and Ndebele kingdom and is in the area of today's Zimbabwe. Mthwakazi is widely used to refer to inhabitants of Matebeleland Province in Zimbabwe.

Slave trade

Colonial period

Scramble for Africa

Post-colonial period

History of Southern African Architecture

Further information in the sections of Architecture of Africa:
 Medieval Southern African Architecture

History of science and technology in Southern Africa

Further information in the sections of History of science and technology in Africa:

 Astronomy
 Mathematics
 Medicine
 Agriculture
 Textiles
 Architecture
 Warfare
 By country

Military history of Southern Africa

Genetic history of Southern Africa

Archaic Human DNA

While Denisovan and Neanderthal ancestry in non-Africans outside of Africa are more certain, archaic human ancestry in Africans is less certain and is too early to be established with certainty.

Ancient DNA

Three Later Stone Age hunter-gatherers carried ancient DNA similar to Khoisan-speaking hunter-gatherers. Prior to the Bantu migration into the region, as evidenced by ancient DNA from Botswana, East African herders migrated into Southern Africa. Out of four Iron Age Bantu agriculturalists of West African origin, two earlier agriculturalists carried ancient DNA similar to Tsonga and Venda peoples and the two later agriculturalists carried ancient DNA similar to Nguni people; this indicates that there were various movements of peoples in the overall Bantu migration, which resulted in increased interaction and admixing between Bantu-speaking peoples and Khoisan-speaking peoples.

Botswana

At Nqoma, in Botswana, an individual, dated to the Early Iron Age (900 BP), carried haplogroup L2a1f.

At Taukome, in Botswana, an individual, dated to the Early Iron Age (1100 BP), carried haplogroups E1b1a1 (E-M2, E-Z1123) and L0d3b1.

At Xaro, in Botswana, there were two individuals, dated to the Early Iron Age (1400 BP); one carried haplogroups E1b1a1a1c1a and L3e1a2, and another carried haplogroups E1b1b1b2b (E-M293, E-CTS10880) and L0k1a2.

Malawi

Fingira

At Fingira, in Malawi, an individual, estimated to date between 6175 BP and 5913 BP, carried haplogroups BT and L0d1b2b.

At Fingira, in Malawi, an individual, estimated to date between 6177 BP and 5923 BP, carried haplogroups BT and L0d1c.

At Fingira, in Malawi, an individual, estimated to date between 2676 BP and 2330 BP, carried haplogroup L0f.

Chencherere

At Chencherere, in Malawi, an individual, estimated to date between 5400 BP and 4800 BP, carried haplogroup L0k2.

At Chencherere, in Malawi, an individual, estimated to date between 5293 BP and 4979 BP, carried haplogroup L0k1.

Hora

At Hora, in Malawi, an individual, estimated to date between 10,000 BP and 5000 BP, carried haplogroups BT and L0k2.

At Hora, in Malawi, an individual, estimated to date between 8173 BP and 7957 BP, carried haplogroup L0a2.

South Africa

At Doonside, in South Africa, an individual, estimated to date between 2296 BP and 1910 BP, carried haplogroup L0d2.

At Champagne Castle, in South Africa, an individual, estimated to date between 448 BP and 282 BP, carried haplogroup L0d2a1a.

At Eland Cave, in South Africa, an individual, estimated to date between 533 BP and 453 BP, carried haplogroup L3e3b1.

At Mfongosi, in South Africa, an individual, estimated to date between 448 BP and 308 BP, carried haplogroup L3e1b2.

At Newcastle, in South Africa, an individual, estimated to date between 508 BP and 327 BP, carried haplogroup L3e2b1a2.

At St. Helena, in South Africa, an individual, estimated to date between 2241 BP and 1965 BP, carried haplogroups A1b1b2a and L0d2c1.

At Faraoskop Rock Shelter, in South Africa, an individual, estimated to date between 2017 BP and 1748 BP, carried haplogroups A1b1b2a and L0d1b2b1b.

At Kasteelberg, in South Africa, an individual, estimated to date between 1282 BP and 1069 BP, carried haplogroup L0d1a1a.

At Vaalkrans Shelter, in South Africa, an individual, estimated to date to 200 BP, is predominantly related to Khoisan speakers, partly related (15% - 32%) to East Africans, and carried haplogroups L0d3b1.

Ballito Bay

At Ballito Bay, in South Africa, an individual, estimated to date between 1986 BP and 1831 BP, carried haplogroups A1b1b2 and L0d2c1.

At Ballito Bay, in South Africa, an individual, estimated to date between 2149 BP and 1932 BP, carried haplogroups A1b1b2 and L0d2a1.

Y-Chromosomal DNA

Various Y chromosome studies show that the San carry some of the most divergent (oldest) human Y-chromosome haplogroups. These haplogroups are specific sub-groups of haplogroups A and B, the two earliest branches on the human Y-chromosome tree.

Mitochondrial DNA

Mitochondrial DNA studies also provide evidence that the San carry high frequencies of the earliest haplogroup branches in the human mitochondrial DNA tree. This DNA is inherited only from one's mother. The most divergent (oldest) mitochondrial haplogroup, L0d, has been identified at its highest frequencies in the southern African San groups.

Autosomal DNA

In a study published in March 2011, Brenna Henn and colleagues found that the ǂKhomani San, as well as the Sandawe and Hadza peoples of Tanzania, were the most genetically diverse of any living humans studied. This high degree of genetic diversity hints at the origin of anatomically modern humans.

Medical DNA

Among the ancient DNA from three hunter-gatherers sharing genetic similarity with San people and four Iron Age agriculturalists, their SNPs indicated that they bore variants for resistance against sleeping sickness and Plasmodium vivax. In particular, two out of the four Iron Age agriculturalists bore variants for resistance against sleeping sickness and three out of the four Iron Age agriculturalists bore Duffy negative variants for resistance against malaria. In contrast to the Iron Age agriculturalists, from among the San-related hunter-gatherers, a six year old boy may have died from schistosomiasis. In Botswana, a man, who dates to 1400 BP, may have also carried the Duffy negative variant for resistance against malaria.

Timeline of archaeological cultures and sites

 Lomekwi (3,300,000 BP)
 Taung (3,030,000 BP)
 Sterkfontein (2,800,000 BP)
 Drimolen (2,000,000 BP)
 Kromdraai fossil site (2,000,000 BP)
 Cooper's Cave (1,900,000 BP)
 Canteen Kopje (1,890,000 BP)
 Swartkrans (1,800,000 BP)
 Motsetsi (1,640,000 BP)
 Wonderwerk Cave (1,000,000 BP)
 Amanzi Springs archaeological site (Middle Pleistocene)
 Rising Star Cave (414,000 BP)
 Kalambo Falls (300,000 BP – 200,000 BP)
 Duinefontein (290,000 BP)
 Gladysvale Cave (257,000 BP)
 Florisbad archaeological and paleontological site (200,000 BP)
 Mumbwa Caves (194,000 BP – 124,000 BP)
 Pinnacle Point (164,000 BP)
 Hoedjiespunt (130,000 BP)
 Ngalue (105,000 BP)
 Blombos Cave (84,000 BP)
 Stillbay (80,000 BP)
 Howieson's Poort Shelter (80,000 BP – 60,000 BP)
 Mousteroid (80,000 BP – 50,000 BP)
 Peers Cave (75,000 BP)
 Howiesons Poort (68,000 BP – 60,000 BP)
 Boomplaas Cave (66,000 BP)
 Klasies River Caves (66,000 BP)
 Diepkloof Rock Shelter (65,000 BP)
 Plovers Lake (62,900 BP)
 Sibudu Cave (61,000 BP)
 Fauresmith (industry) (60,300 BP – 32,600 BP)
 Border Cave (58,200 BP)
 Ngwenya Mine (43,000 BP)
 Apollo 11 Cave (30,000 BP)
 Elands Bay Cave (19,398 BP)
 Tsodilo (14,500 BP)
 Mwela Rock Paintings (10,820 BP)
 Kalemba Rockshelter (10,000 BP – 8,000 BP)
 Matsieng Footprints (10,000 BP – 3000 BP)
 Nelson Bay Cave (9000 BP)
 Jubilee Shelter (8500 BP)
 Twyfelfontein (5850 BP)
 Rose Cottage Cave (4000 BP)
 The White Lady (3000 BCE – 1500 BCE)
 Mussel Point (3500 BP)
 Byneskranskop (3200 BP – 1500 BP)
 Driekops Eiland (2500 BP)
 Bambata Cave (215 CE)
 Ziwa (1630 BP)
 Chibuene (7th century CE)
 Toutswemogala Hill (7th century CE – 19th century CE)
 Leopard's Kopje (750 CE – 800 CE)
 Bambandyanalo (1000 CE)
 Great Zimbabwe (1300 CE)
 Domboshaba (1300 CE – 1600 CE)
 Majojo (1300 CE – 1650 CE)
 Mbande Hill (600 BP)
 Kingdom of Mapungubwe (1370 CE – 1410 CE)
 Manyikeni (14th century CE)
 Khami (1450 CE – 1820 CE)
 Dzata ruins (pre-1600 CE)
 Blaauboschkraal stone ruins (16th century CE)
 Ingombe Ilede (16th century CE)
 Danangombe (1650 CE – 1815 CE)
 Burchell's Shelter (post-1660 CE)
 Mamuno Monument (200 BP)
 Kaditshwene (1790 CE)
 Bumbusi National Monument (18th century CE)
 Tlokwe Ruins (19th century CE)
 Old Palapye (19th century CE)
 Dundo (1912 CE)

List of archaeological cultures and sites

 Cango Caves
 Eye of Kuruman
 Gwisho Hot-Springs
 Heritage Western Cape
 Kathu Archaeological Complex
 ǁKhauxaǃnas
 Kogelbeen Cave
 Kolobeng Mission
 Magosian
 Makapansgat
 Malapa Fossil Site, Cradle of Humankind
 Melkhoutboom Cave
 Melville Koppies
 Naletale
 Nooitgedacht Glacial Pavements
 Northern Cape Heritage Resources Authority
 Nyambwezi Falls
 Paternoster Midden
 Sangoan
 Schoemansdal, Limpopo
 Sedan Beehive stone huts
 Wildebeest Kuil Rock Art Centre
 Witsie's Cave (Lekhalong la Witsie)

References

Southern Africa
History of Africa by region
Sub-Saharan Africa
Natural history of Africa